Messer is a surname. It may refer to:

People
 Alf Messer (1900–1947), English footballer
 Casey Messer (born 1983), 2007 Miss New Mexico USA
 Dale Messer (born 1937), American football player
 David Messer, 21st century Australian cartoonist
 Don Messer (1909–1973), Canadian musician, band leader and radio broadcaster, host of the television program Don Messer’s Jubilee
 Donald E. Messer (born 1941), American United Methodist theologian and author
 Erica Messer, 21st century American television writer, producer and story editor
 Frank Messer (1925–2001), American sportscaster
 Glenn Messer (1895–1995), American aviation pioneer
 Jonathan Messer (born 1976), Australian director
 Ken Messer (1931–2018), British painter
 Michael Messer (born 1956), English musician and record producer
 Robert Messer (1887–1918), Scottish footballer
 Sam Messer (born 1955), American painter
 Samuel Messer, birth name of American actor Robert Middleton (1911–1977)
 Sarah Messer (born 1966), American poet and author
 Thomas M. Messer (1920–2013), director of the Solomon R. Guggenheim Foundation 1961–1988

Fictional characters
 Danny Messer, on the television series CSI: NY

Occupational surnames